Patrick Moncreiff (c.1674–1709), of Reidie and Myres Castle, Fife, was a Scottish politician who sat in the Parliament of Scotland from 1706  to 1707 and in the British House of Commons  from 1707 to  1709.

Moncreiff was the second, but eldest surviving son. of George Moncreiff, of Reidie and Myres Castle and his wife  Margaret Leslie, daughter of John Leslie of Myres Castle. In 1694 he became a lieutenant in   Lord John Murray’s  newly formed regiment  of Foot and was then  captain from 1695 until the regiment was disbanded in 1697. He studied at Leyden in 1698, aged 24.  He returned  to Scotland, and was admitted as an advocate in 1701. He became a  Burgess of Edinburgh in 1702 and on 1 March 1702, married Anna or Agnes Skene, widow of James Skene of Grange and Kirkcaldy, Fife, and daughter of John Drummond of Cultmalundie, Perth. She died before 7 April 1720.

Moncreiff was returned to  the Scottish parliament as Burgh Commissioner  for Kinghorn on 18 June 1706. 
He supported the Court over the Union and was said to be under the influence of the Earl of Leven. Moncreiff was a courtier and on that basis was selected as one of the Scottish representatives to the first Parliament of Great Britain in 1707. He  spoke on behalf of  the Court in the debates on the abolition of the Scottish privy council in December 1707, and was complimented on the quality of his speeches. In March 1708 he  became a captain and lieutenant-colonel   in the Scots Foot Guards.

At  the 1708 British general election, Moncreiff was returned in a fierce contest as  Member of Parliament for Fife. 
 
Moncreiff died in London on or shortly before 20 January 1709 leaving a son and daughter.

References

1670s births
1709 deaths
Burgh Commissioners to the Parliament of Scotland
Members of the Parliament of Scotland 1702–1707
Members of the Parliament of Great Britain for Scottish constituencies
British MPs 1708–1710